Sir Raza Ali Khan Bahadur GCIE, KCSI (17 November 1908 – 6 March 1966) was a nawab of the princely state of Rampur from 1930 to 1966. A tolerant and progressive ruler, Sir Raza expanded the number of Hindus in his government Including his Prime Minister Lt.Col. Horilal Varma Bar At Law and, expanded the irrigation system, completed electrification projects and continued building schools, roads and sewage systems. Also the Nawab sent his soldiers to fight in the Middle Eastern theatres of the Second World War. Acceding to the Union of India on 15 August 1947, Rampur was formally merged with it in 1949 and with the new state of Uttar Pradesh in 1950. Afterwards, Sir Raza devoted himself to charitable projects and to his post as head of the Freemasons in India as the first Grand Master of the Grand Lodge of India.

Sir Raza died in 1966, aged 57, and like his father, was buried at Karbala, Iraq. He was succeeded by his eldest son, Murtaza Ali Khan Bahadur.

Titles

1908-1930: Nawabzada Muhammad Raza Ali Khan, Wali Ahad Bahadur
1930-1932: His Highness 'Ali Jah, Farzand-i-Dilpazir-i- Daulat-i-Inglishia, Mukhlis ud-Daula, Nasir ul-Mulk, Amir ul-Umara, Nawab Sayyid Muhammad Raza 'Ali Khan Bahadur, Mustaid Jang, Nawab of Rampur
1932-1934: Lieutenant His Highness 'Ali Jah, Farzand-i-Dilpazir-i- Daulat-i-Inglishia, Mukhlis ud-Daula, Nasir ul-Mulk, Amir ul-Umara, Nawab Sayyid Muhammad Raza 'Ali Khan Bahadur, Mustaid Jang, Nawab of Rampur
1934-1936: Captain His Highness 'Ali Jah, Farzand-i-Dilpazir-i- Daulat-i-Inglishia, Mukhlis ud-Daula, Nasir ul-Mulk, Amir ul-Umara, Nawab Sayyid Muhammad Raza 'Ali Khan Bahadur, Mustaid Jang, Nawab of Rampur
1936-1942: Captain His Highness 'Ali Jah, Farzand-i-Dilpazir-i- Daulat-i-Inglishia, Mukhlis ud-Daula, Nasir ul-Mulk, Amir ul-Umara, Nawab Sayyid Sir Muhammad Raza 'Ali Khan Bahadur, Mustaid Jang, Nawab of Rampur, KCSI
1942-1944: Major His Highness 'Ali Jah, Farzand-i-Dilpazir-i- Daulat-i-Inglishia, Mukhlis ud-Daula, Nasir ul-Mulk, Amir ul-Umara, Nawab Sayyid Sir Muhammad Raza 'Ali Khan Bahadur, Mustaid Jang, Nawab of Rampur, KCSI
1944-1946: Lieutenant-Colonel His Highness 'Ali Jah, Farzand-i-Dilpazir-i- Daulat-i-Inglishia, Mukhlis ud-Daula, Nasir ul-Mulk, Amir ul-Umara, Nawab Sayyid Sir Muhammad Raza 'Ali Khan Bahadur, Mustaid Jang, Nawab of Rampur, GCIE, KCSI
1946-1961: Major-General His Highness 'Ali Jah, Farzand-i-Dilpazir-i- Daulat-i-Inglishia, Mukhlis ud-Daula, Nasir ul-Mulk, Amir ul-Umara, Nawab Sayyid Sir Muhammad Raza 'Ali Khan Bahadur, Mustaid Jang, Nawab of Rampur, GCIE, KCSI
1961-1966: Major-General His Highness 'Ali Jah, Farzand-i-Dilpazir-i- Daulat-i-Inglishia, Mukhlis ud-Daula, Nasir ul-Mulk, Amir ul-Umara, Nawab Sayyid Sir Muhammad Raza 'Ali Khan Bahadur, Mustaid Jang, Nawab of Rampur, GCIE, KCSI, Most Worshipful the Grand Master of the Grand Lodge of the Ancient, Free & Accepted Masons of India

Honours

(ribbon bar, as it would look today)

Nishan-i-Hamidia, 1st Class of Rampur
Nishan-i-Iqbal, 1st Class of Rampur
King George V Silver Jubilee Medal, 1935
Knight Commander of the Order of the Star of India (KCSI), 1936
King George VI Coronation Medal, 1937
Knight Grand Commander of the Order of the Indian Empire (GCIE), 1944
Indian Independence Medal, 1947
Queen Elizabeth II Coronation Medal, 1953

External links 

Nawabs of Rampur
Indian knights
Knights Grand Commander of the Order of the Indian Empire
Knights Commander of the Order of the Star of India
Indian Shia Muslims
Indian Freemasons
1908 births
1966 deaths